A loudspeaker is an electroacoustic transducer that converts an electrical signal into sound.

Loudspeaker may refer to:

A public address system
The Loudspeaker, a 1934 American film directed by Joseph Santley
Loudspeaker (album), a 2006 instrumental album by the guitarist Marty Friedman
Loudspeakers (band), a Georgian rock band
Loudspeaker (film), a 2009 Malayalam Cinema directed by Jayaraj starring Mammootty